Hold Your Fire is the second studio album by the hard rock band FireHouse. It was released in June 1992. The album spent thirty weeks in the Billboard 200 Top Albums chart peaking at No. 23.

The album spawned several hit singles like "Reach for the Sky", "Sleeping with You" and "When I Look into Your Eyes". The album was certified gold by the RIAA in the United States.

The album is also known for having the same snare sound as the one used on Dream Theater's album Images and Words, another album produced by David Prater around the same time.

Track listing 
All songs written by Bill Leverty and C.J. Snare, except where noted.
 "Reach for the Sky" – 4:47
 "Rock You Tonight" – 4:35
 "Sleeping with You" – 3:51
 "You're Too Bad" – 3:38
 "When I Look into Your Eyes" – 4:00
 "Get in Touch" – 5:24
 "Hold Your Fire" – 3:51
 "The Meaning of Love" – 4:12
 "Talk of the Town" – 4:38
 "Life in the Real World" – 3:36
 "Mama Didn't Raise No Fool" (Foster, Leverty, Richardson, Snare) – 4:00
 "Hold the Dream" – 5:02

Singles 

 "Reach for the Sky" - No. 83 U.S.
 "When I Look into Your Eyes" - No. 8 U.S.
 "Sleeping with You" - No. 78 U.S.

Personnel 
 C.J. Snare – lead vocals, keyboards
 Bill Leverty – guitars
 Perry Richardson – bass guitar
 Michael Foster – drums, percussion

Production
 David Prater – producer
 Michael Caplan – executive producer
 Doug Oberkircher – engineer
 Steve Regina – assistant engineer
 David Prater – mixing
 Doug Oberkircher – mixing
 Vladimir Meller – mastering

Certifications

References

1992 albums
FireHouse (band) albums
Epic Records albums